William Jackson Bean (26 May 1863 in Yorkshire – 19 April 1947 in Kew, Surrey) was a British botanist and plantsman, who was curator of Kew Gardens from 1922 to 1929. He was responsible for some of the present collections of trees and woody plants there.

Bean began his career at Kew Gardens as a trainee gardener. He remained at Kew for over 45 years, reaching the position of curator in 1922. Bean wrote a history of Kew Gardens, which was published in 1908.

He wrote the first two-volume edition of the reference work Trees and Shrubs Hardy in the British Isles, which was published in 1914. A revised four-volume edition of this work remains a standard reference work for woody plants grown in Britain today.

Bean retired from Kew in 1929. In his retirement Bean wrote three other books: Shrubs for Amateurs in 1924, Ornamental Trees for Amateurs in 1925, and Wall Shrubs and Hardy Climbers in 1939. He also revised and expanded Trees and Shrubs several times.

Bean was awarded the Victoria Medal of Honour in 1917 and the Veitch Memorial Medal of the Royal Horticultural Society in 1922. He was awarded the Royal Victorian Order in 1936.

His son George Ewart Bean (1903-1977) was a leading authority on the classical heritage of Turkey.

References

Bibliography

1863 births
1947 deaths
British botanists
Botanists active in Kew Gardens
Victoria Medal of Honour recipients
Veitch Memorial Medal recipients